Arequipa is a district of the Arequipa Province in Peru. The downtown area of the city of Arequipa is located in this district. The current mayor of the district is Omar Julio Candia Aguilar.

References

Districts of the Arequipa Province
Districts of the Arequipa Region